Herbert Augustus Hutchisson (April 19, 1915 – August 14, 1968; last name often misspelled Hutchison) was an American professional basketball player. He played in the National Basketball League for the Columbus Athletic Supply and averaged 8.0 points per game. He also competed for other teams in semi-professional leagues.

References

1915 births
1968 deaths
American men's basketball players
Basketball players from Dayton, Ohio
Columbus Athletic Supply players
Forwards (basketball)
Guards (basketball)
Otterbein Cardinals men's basketball players
Sportspeople from Springfield, Ohio